Lead tetrachloride, also known as lead(IV) chloride, has the molecular formula PbCl4. It is a yellow, oily liquid which is stable below 0 °C, and decomposes at 50 °C. It has a tetrahedral configuration, with lead as the central atom. The Pb–Cl covalent bonds have been measured to be 247 pm and the bond energy is 243 kJ⋅mol−1.

Synthesis 

Lead tetrachloride can be made by reacting lead(II) chloride PbCl2, and hydrochloric acid HCl, in the presence of chlorine gas (Cl2), leading to the formation of chloroplumbic acid H2PbCl6. It is then converted to the ammonium salt (NH4)2PbCl6 by adding ammonium chloride (NH4Cl). Finally, the solution is treated with concentrated sulfuric acid H2SO4, to separate out lead tetrachloride. This series of reactions is conducted at 0 °C. The following equations illustrate the reaction:

PbCl2 + 2HCl + Cl2 → H2PbCl6
H2PbCl6 + 2 NH4Cl → (NH4)2PbCl6 + 2HCl
(NH4)2PbCl6 + H2SO4 → PbCl4+ 2HCl + (NH4)2SO4

Reaction with water 

Unlike carbon tetrachloride, another group IV (IUPAC: group 14) chloride, lead tetrachloride reacts with water. This is because the central atom is bigger (Pb is bigger than C) so there is less cluttering and water can easily access it. Also, because of the presence of empty d orbitals on the Pb atom, oxygen can bind to it before a Pb–Cl bond has to break, thus requiring less energy. The overall reaction is thus as follow:

PbCl4 + 2H2O → PbO2(s) + 4HCl(g)

Stability 

Lead tetrachloride tends to decompose further into lead dichloride and chlorine gas:
PbCl4 →  PbCl2 + Cl2(g)

There are reports that this reaction can proceed explosively and that the compound is best stored under pure sulfuric acid at -80 °C in the dark.

The stability of the +4 oxidation state decreases as we travel down this group of the periodic table. Thus while carbon tetrachloride is a stable compound, with lead the oxidation state +2 is favored and PbCl4 quickly becomes PbCl2. Indeed, the inert pair effect causes lead to favor its +2 oxidation state: Pb atom loses all its outermost p electrons and ends up with a stable, filled s subshell.

Toxicity 

Lead is a cumulative poison. Only limited evidence have been shown of lead's carcinogenic effect, but lead tetrachloride, as well as all other lead compounds, is "reasonably anticipated to be human carcinogens" according to the Report on Carcinogens, Twelfth Edition (2011). Lead can be absorbed by the body through several routes, primarily inhalation but also ingestion and dermal contact. Lead compounds are also teratogens.

References

Lead(IV) compounds
Chlorides
Metal halides